Victor Gabriel Moura de Oliveira (born 4 January 2000), commonly known as Vitinho, is a Brazilian footballer who plays as an attacking midfielder for Arouca.

Career statistics

Club

References

2000 births
Living people
People from Guarulhos
Brazilian footballers
Brazil youth international footballers
Association football midfielders
Campeonato Brasileiro Série A players
Sport Club Corinthians Paulista players
CR Vasco da Gama players
Footballers from São Paulo (state)